The following student-athletes, coaching staff, or alumni of the University of North Carolina at Chapel Hill have represented their country in the Olympic Games as athletes, coaching staff, press officers, or administrators.

An asterisk (*) denotes a coach or trainer.

Berlin 1936 

Summer Games of the XI Olympiad, Berlin, Germany

London 1948 

Summer Games of the XIV Olympiad, London, United Kingdom

Helsinki 1952 

Summer Games of the XV Olympiad, Helsinki, Finland

Melbourne 1956 

Summer Games of the XVI Olympiad, Melbourne, Australia

Rome 1960 

Summer Games of the XVII Olympiad, Rome, Italy

Tokyo 1964 

Summer Games of the XVIII Olympiad, Tokyo, Japan

Mexico City 1968 

Summer Games of the XIX Olympiad, Mexico City, Mexico

Munich 1972 

Summer Games of the XX Olympiad, Munich, West Germany

Montreal 1976 

Summer Games of the XXI Olympiad, Montreal, Canada

Los Angeles and Sarajevo 1984 

Summer Games of the XXIII Olympiad, Los Angeles, California, United States and Winter Games of the XXIII Olympiad, Sarajevo, Yugoslavia

 Rick Brewer was a press officer.

Seoul and Calgary 1988 

Summer Games of the XXIV Olympiad, Seoul, South Korea and Winter Games of the XXIV Olympiad, Calgary, Canada

 Press officer: Dave Lohse.

Barcelona and Albertville 1992 

Summer Games of the XXV Olympiad, Barcelona, Spain and Winter Games of the XXV Olympiad, Albertville, France

  Press officer: Frank Zang

Lillehammer 1994 

Winter Games of the XXVI Olympiad, Lillehammer, Norway

  Press officer: Frank Zang

Atlanta 1996 

Summer Games of the XXVI Olympiad, Atlanta, Georgia, United States

 Full-time employees: Dave Lohse, Chris Schleter; Olympic Broadcasting Organization: Kevin Best; Organizing Committee: Donald Lockerbie; Press officer: Frank Zang; Team physician: Tim Taft.

Sydney 2000 

Summer Games of the XXVII Olympiad, Sydney, Australia

 Full-time employee: Chris Schleter;  Olympic Broadcasting Organization: Kevin Best; Organizing Committee: Donald Lockerbie.

Salt Lake City 2002 

Winter Games of the XXVIII Olympiad, Salt Lake City, United States

 Full-time employee: Chris Schleter.  Olympic Broadcasting Organization: Kevin Best.

Athens 2004 

Summer Games of the XXVIII Olympiad, Athens, Greece

 Full-time employee: Chris Schleter; Organizing Committee: Donald Lockerbie.

Turin 2006 

Winter Games of the XXIX Olympiad, Turin, Italy

Full-time employee: Chris Schleter.

Beijing 2008 

Summer Games of the XXIX Olympiad, Beijing, China

London 2012 

Summer Games of the XXX Olympiad, London, England

Rio 2016 

Summer Games of the XXXI Olympiad, Rio de Janeiro, Brazil

Tokyo 2020

Summer Games of the XXXIII Olympiad, Tokyo, Japan

References

North Carolina at Chapel Hill University of
Olympians
North Carolina
University of North Carolina at Chapel Hill Olympians